Volcana may refer to:
Volcana (Marvel Comics)
Volcana (DC Comics)

See also
Volcano (disambiguation)